Lavrente Calinov was a Romanian sprint canoer who competed in the late 1950s and early 1960s. He won one silver medals in the C-2 10000 m event at the ICF Canoe Sprint World Championships in 1958. He also won 5 silver and bronze medals in the C-2 10000 m event at the European Canoe Sprint World Championships in 1957, 1958, 1960, and 1963.

Early life 
Lavrente Calinov was born in the Danube Delta of Romania in the village of Mila 23 accessible only by boat in a Russian speaking Old Believers community known as Lipovans on August 16, 1936. By the time he was 10 he started helping his father Ignat with fishing work in the Danube Delta. At 16 he left home to work in the city of Sulina as a fisherman on the Black Sea until he was drafted in the Romanian conscription based military service at the time.

Competitive career 
Lavrente's career started at the CSA Steaua, which at the time was the sports club ran by the Romanian armed forces, and this is where he won his first two international medals in 1957 and 1958. He transferred two years later to CS Dinamo București where he stayed until the end of his career. His main event was Sprint Canoe 2, 10,000 m, but he occasionally competed in the C2 1,000 m event. His stance in the sprint canoe was right handed. His main event was not an Olympic event at the time, so he only competed in World and European championships, never in the Olympics. He retired from the sport in 1968.

Personal life 
He married Aniuta Pogor in 1963 and had two children, Iulian Doroftei born in 1967 and Olga Lucheria born in 1972.

References
ICF medals: http://www.canoeresults.eu/medals?year=&name=Kalinov+Lavrente

Lavrente Calinov on the official Canoe site from Romania http://www.canoe.ro/?page=special&root_category=5&child_category=62
Lavrente Calinov mentioned as non olympian podium finisher 3rd 1963 C2 10000 m. 
Lavrente Calinov bronze medal at European Championships in 1957. http://www.csasteaua.ro/1957/
Famous people from Mila 23 https://adevarul.ro/locale/tulcea/delta-patria-invingatorilor-mila-23-crisan-caraorman-dat-24-campioni-mondiali-patzaichin-nu-stiu-m-am-nascut-apa-uscat-1_561ff4edf5eaafab2cb2a1e8/index.html

Specific

Romanian male canoeists
Romanian people of Russian descent
ICF Canoe Sprint World Championships medalists in Canadian
1936 births
Living people
People from Tulcea County